High House, Penrhos, Monmouthshire is an important Renaissance house dating from the 17th century. Its style, with its exceptionally high roofline, is unique in Monmouthshire. It is a Grade II* listed building.

History and description
High House is of two storeys with attics set in a very elevated roof.The house is of rubble covered with painted render and the roof tiling is modern. In their three-volume history, Monmouthshire Houses, Fox and Raglan wrote of the "striking and symmetrical elevation, the high roof-ridge and tall chimneys no doubt the reason for its name". The architectural historian John Newman described High House as "a bizarre hybrid, of unforgettable silhouette". Its Cadw listing records it as “an important Renaissance house of 1675”, and the Royal Commission on the Ancient and Historical Monuments of Wales notes that its design, with its elevated roofline is “unique in Monmouthshire”.

The house is privately-owned. The gardens are occasionally opened under the National Gardens Scheme.

Notes

References
 
 

Grade II* listed buildings in Monmouthshire
History of Monmouthshire
Country houses in Monmouthshire